Bartoň (feminine Bartoňová) is a Czech surname. Notable people with the surname include:

 Antonín Bartoň (1908–1982), Czech skier
 Jakub Barton (born 1981), Czech hockey player
 Luboš Bartoň (born 1980), Czech basketball player
 Kateřina Bartoňová (born 1990), Czech basketball player
 Zdeňka Bartoňová-Šilhavá (born 1956), Czech discus thrower

See also
Barton (surname)

Czech-language surnames